Babović is a South-Slavic surname. Notable people with the surname include:

Anastasija Babović, handball player
Branko Babović, actor
Milka Babović (born 1928), Croatian athlete and journalist
Nenad Babović (born 1976), Serbian rower
Stefan Babović, soccer player
Toma D.Babović, photographer
Tomo R.Babović, composer

Serbian surnames